Hubynykha is an urban-type settlement in Novomoskovsk Raion of Dnipropetrovsk Oblast in Ukraine. It is located on the Hubynykha, a left tributary of the Kilchen, in the basin of the Dnieper. Hubynykha hosts the administration of Hubynykha settlement hromada, one of the hromadas of Ukraine. Population:

Climate

Economy

Transportation
Hubynykha railway station is on the railway connecting Dnipro and Krasnohrad with further connections to Kharkiv and Sloviansk. There is regular passenger traffic.

The settlement has access to  Highway M18 connecting Kharkiv with Zaporizhia and Melitopol and to Highway M29 which connects Dnipro and Kharkiv.

Notable people 

 Oleksandr Harbuz - hero of Ukraine was born in Hubynykha.

References

Urban-type settlements in Novomoskovsk Raion